Radio 1's Live Lounge – Volume 4 is a collection of live tracks from Jo Whiley's and Fearne Cotton's Radio 1 shows. The album is the fourth in a series of Live Lounge albums. It consists of both covers and the bands' own songs. The album was released on 26 October 2009.

Track listing

See also
Live Lounge
Radio 1's Live Lounge
Radio 1's Live Lounge – Volume 2
Radio 1's Live Lounge – Volume 3
Radio 1's Live Lounge - Volume 5
Radio 1: Established 1967

References

External links
Radio 1's Live Lounge – Volume 4 on Myspace

Live Lounge
2009 compilation albums
Covers albums
2009 live albums